Glonn is a river in Bavaria, Germany.

Its source is in Glonn in the Ebersberg district and it flows in the south-east direction via Beyharting (Tuntenhausen) to Bad Aibling, where it flows into the Mangfall.

Its name originates from "Glana", "the clear one" (female) in Celtic languages.

See also
List of rivers in Bavaria

References

External links

Rivers of Bavaria
Rivers of Germany